This is a list of crime films released in 2008.

References

2000s
2008-related lists